Denis Lian (born 8 March 1972) is a Singaporean race car driver.

Denis Lian is Singapore's most successful professional racing driver. In 2002, he was crowned Asian Formula 2000 Champion, becoming the first Singaporean to win an international motorsports title. In 2005, he went on to become the first Singaporean to compete in Europe when he raced in the Formula Palmer Audi Euro Series. In 2006, he established his own Formula V6 Asia race team to compete in the regions then premier series, finishing 5th overall as driver and team owner. Later that year, he was selected to represent Singapore in A1GP, the World Cup of Motorsports. He raced for A1 Team Singapore in the 2006/2007 season with a best place finish of 18th overall. Denis also had a successful career in the automotive industry, initially as brand manager for Lotus Cars Singapore from 2004 to 2005 and subsequently as brand manager for McLaren Singapore from 2011 to 2013. In 2015, he was appointed CEO of Johor Motorsports, the company tasked with redeveloping the iconic Johor Circuit in Malaysia. Denis currently competes in various international endurance events, like the 24h Dubai, 12h Gulf and 12h Sepang. In 2014, he competed in the Asian Le Mans Series for the first time and eventually finished runner up in the drivers championship (CN category). In 2015, he went one better and clinched the Asian Le Mans Series Drivers Champion title (CN category) once again becoming the first Singaporean to do so.

Karting
Denis started karting at the age of 9 and continued to do so while he was studying in Australia. When he got back to Singapore he was fortunate enough to be sponsored by the premier kart racing team: Kartmaster. It was a golden opportunity to prove himself and he did not disappoint, placing on the podium at every single race entered. By the age of 21, he was runner-up in the  Singapore National Karting Championship and had finished third overall in the 1993 International Kart Prix.

Karting to Formula 2000

Denis made his transition to car racing in 1994 while competing in the Australian Club Racing series. He quickly worked his way up the club ranks by winning every race he entered. In 1999 he was invited by the series organizer to join the Asian Formula 2000 Championship. In his first race at Johor Circuit, Denis qualified 5th on the grid and finished 5th in the race. In 2001 he competed full-time in Formula 2000 and clinched 3rd overall that season. Then in 2002, he became the overall champion by winning three races that season and qualified in pole position twice, breaking two lap records along the way. By doing so, Denis established himself as the first Singaporean to ever win an international motorsports title.

From Asia to the world
In 2005, Denis became the first Singaporean to compete in Europe when he entered the Formula Palmer Audi Euroseries halfway through the season. With no prior testing done in the series, he stunned the press by finishing in the top five at all the classic European race venues. A year after, A1 Team Singapore asked him to join them in their first-ever season of A1 Grand Prix. In 2006 Denis also competed in the Formula V6 Asia by Renault as the only team owner and driver. He finished 5th overall in that series.

Endurance Racing
Even though he's enjoyed a long and successful Formula car career, Denis has always shown a strong affinity towards Endurance racing early on. From 2001 to 2010, he was a factory nominated driver for TVR Malaysia, Lotus Cars Asia Pacific, Proton R3 and Empire Motorsports Lotus, competing for the respective manufacturers in various international endurance races. He has driven and helped develop an eclectic mix of GT cars, ranging from the TVR Chimera GTS, Lotus Elise S1, 340R, Exige S1/S2 and 2-Eleven GT4

Denis currently competes in the Asian Le Mans Series where he races in the CN category with Team Avelon Formula. He won the 2015/2016 Asian Le Mans Drivers Championship.

Personal life
Denis SCUBA dives and sails for pleasure. He also has a Private Pilots Licence (PPL) and indulges in flying aerobatics occasionally.

Achievements
2017 FRD China LMP3 Series. 5th Overall at Zhejiang International Circuit.
2015/2016 Asian Le Mans Series Drivers Champion (CN Category). 2 wins and 1 pole position.
2nd overall, 2014 Asian Le Mans Series Drivers Championship (CN Category).
2nd & 3rd in Class (ProAm), 2013 Lamborghini Super Trofeo Asia Series, Korea Inje Circuit. 3rd overall, Malaysian Super Series Rd.2 Sepang.
2nd overall, 2012 12hr Gulf Endurance race. Abu Dhabi YAS Marina Circuit. Wolf Racing endurance debut
2007 to 2010 Empire Motosports Lotus. Competing in 12h MME and 24h Dubai Endurance event.
5th overall, 2006 Formula V6 Asia Championship. Raced for A1GP Team Singapore at the 2006 Czech Republic Grand Prix, 18th overall (1st Singaporean Grand Prix driver). Practiced at the Dutch Grand Prix but did not race on medical grounds
Mid season participation in the 2005 Formula Palmer Audi Championship. 8th overall at Spa, 6th overall Monza and 5th overall Brands Hatch (1st Singaporean to compete in Europe).
Works driver for Proton R3 Motorsports, 4th overall, 2004 Merdeka Millennium Endurance race.
Works driver for TVR Malaysia, 8th overall, 2003 Merdeka Millennium Endurance race.
4th overall, 2002 Macau Grand Prix, Asian Formula 2000 Challenge.
2002 Asian Formula 2000 Champion. 3 wins, 2 pole-positions and 2 lap records (1st Singaporean to win an International Motorsports championship). Works driver for Lotus Cars Asia Pacific, 2002 Merdeka 12hr Endurance race.
3rd overall, 2001 Asian Formula 2000 Championship. Works driver for Lotus Cars Asia Pacific, 2002 Merdeka Millennium Endurance race (1st Singaporean to compete in the Merdeka Millennium Endurance race).
4th overall, 2000 Asian Formula 2000 Championship (round 2 spot entry). 2nd overall, 2000 Caltex Subaru Rally Challenge (2WD Class). 3rd overall, 2000 Singapore Tour de Rally (2WD Class)
5th overall, 1999 Asian Formula 2000 Championship (round 11 spot entry. Debut formula car race). 11th overall, 1999 Sepang F1 Grand Prix support race,   Proton GTi Challenge.
1st overall, 1997 Melbourne Asian Car Race (Australia), driving a Group N Subaru WRX. 2 overall wins in the 1997 Australian Club Car Series, driving a Group N Subaru WRX.
2nd overall, 1993 Singapore National Karting Championship, scoring the most FTD’s. 3rd overall, 1993 CIK International Kart Prix (ICA).

Complete A1 Grand Prix results
(key) (Races in bold indicate pole position) (Races in italics indicate fastest lap)

References

 

1972 births
A1 Team Singapore drivers
Formula V6 Asia drivers
Living people
Singaporean people of Chinese descent
Singaporean racing drivers
Asian Le Mans Series drivers